Murder by an Aristocrat is a 1932 mystery thriller novel by the American writer Mignon G. Eberhart.

Film adaptation
In 1936 the book was adapted into a film of the same title, produced by Hollywood studio Warner Brothers and directed by Frank McDonald. The cast featured Lyle Talbot, Marguerite Churchill and Claire Dodd.

References

Bibliography
 Goble, Alan. The Complete Index to Literary Sources in Film. Walter de Gruyter, 1999.

1932 American novels
American thriller novels
American mystery novels
American novels adapted into films
Novels by Mignon G. Eberhart
Doubleday (publisher) books